Epiphyllum hookeri is a species of climbing cactus in the Epiphyllum genus. It forms showy white flowers and is native from Mexico through Central America to Venezuela. A perennial, it was introduced to Florida and some West Indian islands.

References 

Epiphyllum